Sing Song may refer to:

"Sing Song" by Christina Rossetti used in Moonlight Waltz
Sing Song (EP), the title of the debut EP of the indie pop band The Little Ones
"Sing Song" by Sudden Sway	1986
"Sing Song" by The Tea Set	1979